A Woman's Case (tr. Mikreh Isha) is a 1969 black and white Israeli independent underground experimental dramatic art film, the first Israeli film to be screened at the Venice Film Festival, directed by Jacques Katmor, and, usually, categorized as belonging to the bohemian/counterculture and anarchistic  movement. The film was released on DVD by NMC Music. Cinematographer and coscreenwriter Amnon Salomon stated, during an interview, held late in life, that the film's origin is in Katmor's early exhibition, dealing with the female body, and, that no commercial motivations were held by the filmmakers.

Synopsis
This modernist and non-linear film, influenced by the French New Wave, and, especially, by films such as Jules and Jim and Breathless, tells the story of an advertiser (Yossi Spector), in his forties, who, meets Helit, a model, in her twenties, and, together, the two spend a day in Tel Aviv and Jerusalem, The model leads the advertiser into cafés and drug-fueled orgies, while, he leads her into the workshops of sculptors, so, that they could create sculptures, modeled on her body, out of gypsum. While she tries to liberate his mind, he attempts to stay where he is. The film ends with the advertiser strangling Helit to death, during a sadomasochistic session.

Reception
Maariv compared the film to the works of James Joyce, Jean-Luc Godard, and, Michelangelo Antonioni, with the acting of  being compared to that of Monica Vitti, writer Yoram Kaniuk wrote that the film is a critique of the horrors of the modern world, and, Davar compared the film to painting. The film, however, was a commercial failure, with only 38,000 tickets sold, due to its highly avant-garde nature.

References

External links

1960s avant-garde and experimental films
1969 drama films
1969 independent films
1969 films
Anti-modernist films
BDSM in films
Films about advertising
Films about anarchism
Films about death
Films about drugs
Films about modeling
Films about the visual arts
Films directed by Jacques Katmor
Films set in Jerusalem
Films set in restaurants
Films set in Tel Aviv
Films shot in Israel
1960s Hebrew-language films
Hippie films
Israeli avant-garde and experimental films
Israeli black-and-white films
Israeli crime drama films
Israeli independent films
Nonlinear narrative films
Women and death
1969 directorial debut films